The Ocean Center Building is a 14-story, 197-foot-tall residential building  in downtown Long Beach, California. It was built in 1929 and designed by Raymond M. Kennedy under the Los Angeles architecture firm Meyer & Holler.

Description and architecture

The original layout of the Ocean Center Building had two ground floors: an entrance above the shoreline on the bluff level to take advantage of its address on 110 West Ocean Boulevard, and an east entrance at the base of the Pine Avenue incline providing beach access and accommodating the Walk of a Thousand Lights of The Pike amusement zone. At the time the building housed a collection of shops, offices and parking. At beach level there was a shopping arcade (architecture) archway key-stoned a restaurant (later converted to a penny arcade) and an immense menswear store (later converted to the Hollywood on the Pike cabaret,) and several small shops up the sidewalk incline of Pine St. There was a  monthly rental parking space above the shops. The rest of the building was reserved for retail and office space. The office space above the lobby was divided by varying heights of the roof, allowing outdoor roof-top balcony space to select offices, turrets and a tower. The roofline is different when viewed from the east or west. Battlements along the different roof heights give the observer the impression of the building as being a castle.

Though originally built next to the shoreline, a number of geological and engineering changes have made it so today there is a long walk to seawater from the Ocean Center Building.  When the Long Beach Harbor and breakwater were developed, and the Los Angeles River straightened and levied by the United States Army Corps of Engineers, the Pacific Ocean no longer swept the alluvial granite sand away and the deposits of sandy beach continued to widen. By the 1950s the sand of the beach had grown so wide that the space between the shoreline and the Ocean Center Building was paved as a parking lot and is now Seaside Way. Coastal landfill continued, the beach filled in, then Shoreline Drive and Shoreline Village were built upon the fill.

Ocean Center has made use of frontage which had originally been a boardwalk placed onto the sand easing access from Pine St. and the shore end of the Long Beach Pier to the bathhouse (1902), later named The Plunge. The low-tech boardwalk was originally known as The Pike, which later changed context to include the entire entertainment zone of rides, snack stands and midway games. The area has been featured in thousands of tourist photographs and several television shows and motion pictures, such as It's a Mad, Mad, Mad, Mad World. The boardwalk was paved in concrete and illuminated by strings of lights hung across it from the roofs of its shops and games, then was renamed The Walk of 1000 lights. The Ocean Center Building arcade presented the first impression to many visitors as a grand gateway to fun.

The building is currently being converted from office space into residential units. In 2017 the office building was purchased by Long Beach based Pacific6 with plans for conversion to residential units.
The project was started in 2019, and when finished it will have approximately 80 units with access to rooftop terraces, the ground floor along Ocean Blvd. and Pine Ave. will have space for restaurants and boutiques.

References 

Downtown Long Beach
Skyscrapers in Long Beach, California
Skyscraper office buildings in California
Landmarks in Long Beach, California
Office buildings completed in 1929